Gold fluoride may refer to:

 Gold(I) fluoride
 Gold(III) fluoride
 Gold(V) fluoride
Gold heptafluoride